The 1906 Kansas State Aggies football team represented Kansas State Agricultural College during the 1906 college football season.

Schedule

References

Kansas State
Kansas State Wildcats football seasons
Kansas State Aggies football